HD 149404, also known as HR 6164 and V918 Scorpii, is a star about 4,300 light years from the Earth, in the constellation Scorpius. It is a 5th magnitude star, so it will be faintly visible to the naked eye of an observer far from city lights. It is a rotating ellipsoidal variable, a binary star for which the two stars' combined brightness varies slightly, from magnitude 5.42 to 5.50, during their 9.8 day orbital period. It is one of the brightest members of the Ara OB1 association, which has the open cluster NGC 6193 at its center.

The brightness variability of HD 149404 was marginally detected by the Argentinian astronomer Alenjandro Feinstein, during a photoelectric photometry study undertaken from 1963 through 1965. It was given the variable star designation V918 Scorpii in 1980. In 1977, Peter Conti et al. discovered that HD 149404 has double spectral lines, implying it is a spectroscopic binary. Philip Massey and Peter Conti derived the first set of orbital elements for the binary system, in 1979.

The secondary star in the HD 149404 system is believed to have originally been the more massive of the two, but it is now less massive than the primary due to mass transfer caused by Roche lobe overflow in the past. The secondary may still be close to filling its Roche lobe.  It is a rare ON supergiant, a star with unusually strong absorption lines of nitrogen in its stellar spectrum. Spectroscopic studies show that both stars have a stellar wind and a shock is formed where the two winds collide, which produces emission line features.

References

Scorpius (constellation)
081305
006164
Scorpii, V918
Binary stars
Rotating ellipsoidal variables
O-type supergiants
Emission-line stars